Cowin Mathurin (born June 8, 1983) is a Saint Lucian footballer who currently plays for Antigua Barracuda FC in the USL Professional Division.

Club career
Mathurin played for Goldsmitty in the Antigua and Barbuda Premier Division in 2009/10, and was his team's top scorer, before controversially signing for league rivals Parham prior to the 2010/11 season.

In 2011 Mathurin transferred to the new Antigua Barracuda FC team prior to its first season in the USL Professional Division. He made his debut for the Barracudas on April 17, 2011 in the team's first ever competitive game, a 2–1 loss to the Los Angeles Blues.

References

1983 births
Living people
Saint Lucian footballers
Saint Lucia international footballers
Antigua Barracuda F.C. players
USL Championship players
Association football midfielders